Giorgos Papageorgiou (born 7 June 1997) is a Cypriot professional footballer who plays as a midfielder for Greek Super League 2 club Apollon Smyrnis.

Career

Apollon Smyrnis
On 23 June 2021, Papageorgiou moved to the Superleague Greece, signing a contract with Apollon Smyrnis on a free transfer.

Career statistics

References

External links

1997 births
Living people
Cypriot footballers
Cyprus youth international footballers
Cyprus under-21 international footballers
Cypriot First Division players
Super League Greece players
Ethnikos Achna FC players
Apollon Smyrnis F.C. players
Association football midfielders